Never Alone is the debut album by the band Stitched Up Heart released on June 17, 2016, by Another Century Records. It debuted in the Top 10 of both the Billboard Heatseeker and Hard Rock charts.

Critical reception
In her review for Metal Hammer, Sophie Maughan rated the album with three stars from five, noting that: "...
The five-piece encompass that heavy-yet-emotive ethos on their debut full-length, serving up a sound charged with earnest euphoria and vitriolic nuance." and concluding that "... This band wears their influences on their sleeves, but there are moments where artistic reverence could easily be interpreted as imitation. Stitched Up Heart now need to concentrate on establishing their own signature sound in order to avoid flatlining."

Matthew Cox, in his review for Shockwave Magazine, considered that: "...In an era of trite pop imitators and synthesized sounds, this album metaphorically sends listeners to a time when lyrics and presence of a group of musicians defined their genre. Never Alone personifies the new hard rock genre to near perfection."

Track listing

Personnel 
Alecia "Mixi" Demner - lead vocals
Merritt Goodwin - lead guitar
Dorian Dolore - rhythm guitar
Randy Mathias - bass, backing vocals
James Decker - drums, backing vocals

Additional personnel
Sahaj Ticotin - producer, engineering, additional backing vocals on tracks 3 and 8
Brooke Villanyi - additional backing vocals on tracks 3 and 8, vocal editing on tracks 3, 4, 7, and 9
Bekki Friesen - additional backing vocals on track 2, vocal editing on tracks 1, 2, 5, 6, and 10
Marc Jordan - synth programming, additional guitar, vocal editing, co-producer, on track 2
Mike Gossling - additional programming on tracks 2 and 10
Fumitake Igarashi - additional programming on track 2
Mitchell Marlow - producer, engineering, mixing, additional guitar on track 2

References

2016 debut albums
Stitched Up Heart albums
Another Century Records albums